Thanasi Foods is a manufacturer and distributor of packaged snack foods.  Products distributed by Thanasi Foods are available in approximately 45,000 supermarkets, convenience stores, grocery stores, and drug stores in the United States and Canada.

History
Thanasi was founded in 2004 by Justin "Duke" Havlick. Their brands include Duke's Smoked Shorty Sausages and Bigs Sunflower Seeds. The company was acquired by Conagra Brands in 2017.

References

External links
Thanasi Foods website

Manufacturing companies based in Boulder, Colorado
Food and drink companies based in Colorado
Food and drink companies established in 2004
American companies established in 2004
Snack food manufacturers of the United States
2004 establishments in Colorado
2017 mergers and acquisitions
Conagra Brands